Windows-1250 is a code page used under Microsoft Windows to represent texts in Central European and Eastern European languages that use Latin script, such as Czech (which is its main user with half its use, though Czech has 96.6% use of UTF-8, and mostly abandoned (this) legacy encoding), Polish, Slovak, Hungarian, Slovene, Serbo-Croatian (Latin script), Romanian (before 1993 spelling reform), Rotokas and Albanian. It may also be used with the German language (though it's missing uppercase ẞ); German-language texts encoded with Windows-1250 and Windows-1252 are identical.

This has been replaced by Unicode (such as UTF-8) far more than Windows-1252. As of October 2022, less than 0.04% of all web pages use Windows-1250.

Windows-1250 is similar to ISO-8859-2 and has all the printable characters it has and more. However a few of them are rearranged (unlike Windows-1252, which keeps all printable characters from ISO-8859-1 in the same place). Most of the rearrangements seem to have been done to keep characters shared with Windows-1252 in the same place but three of the characters moved (Ą, Ľ, ź) cannot be explained this way, since those do not occur in Windows-1252 and could have been put in the same positions as in ISO-8859-2 if ˇ had been put e.g. at 9F.

IBM uses code page 1250 (CCSID 1250 and euro sign extended CCSID 5346) for Windows-1250.

Character set
The following table shows Windows-1250. Each character is shown with its Unicode equivalent.

See also
 Latin script in Unicode
 Unicode
 Universal Character Set
 European  Unicode subset (DIN 91379) 
 UTF-8

Notes

References

External links 
 Windows 1250 reference chart
 IANA Charset Name Registration
 Unicode mappings of windows 1250 with "best fit"

Windows code pages